The men's freestyle 65 kg is a competition featured at the 2016 Russian National Freestyle Wrestling Championships, and was held in Yakutsk, Russia on May 29.

Medalists

Results
Legend
F — Won by fall

Finals

Top half

Bottom half

Repechage

References
http://vk.com/doc9602940_437542013?hash=fe171e82d679551276&dl=8ca46f567e49e918d4

Men's freestyle 65 kg